El Bardale is a town located in northwestern Gabiley District in the Maroodi Jeex region of Somaliland.

Overview
It is an agricultural town. Most of the residents are primarily farmers that raise livestock animals such as camels, cattle, goats, sheep and even chickens.

Demographics
The total population of this town is 3,547. The town is primarily inhabited by people from the Somali ethnic group and id is wholly dominated by the Jibril Abokor (Reer Hareed) sub divisions of the Sa'ad Musa subclan of the Habar Awal Isaaq.

References

External links
El Bardale

Populated places in Maroodi Jeex